Twinsburg High School is a public high school in Twinsburg, Ohio, United States.  It is the only high school in the Twinsburg City School District, and serves students in grades 9–12 from most of the city of Twinsburg and Twinsburg Township, along with part of Reminderville. The school colors are blue and white and athletic teams are known as the Tigers and compete in the Suburban League National Division.

History
Built to relieve overcrowding, the current Twinsburg High School building was completed in January 1999 at a cost of $36 million.

Construction of the school and attached city fitness center took three years. During those three years, the school board and community decided that since the population was growing so quickly, that there should be an additional pod on the building. This pod would be a shell and not finished inside until needed. The unfinished L-pod was built out during the spring and summer of 2006.  It was open to the staff and student body for the 2006–2007 school year. Twinsburg High School also offers vocational education training at Cuyahoga Valley Career Center.

Demographics

Notable alumni
 Scott Effross (born 1993); baseball pitcher for the New York Yankees
 Zoltán Meskó; professional football player in the National Football League (NFL)
 Brad Stuver; professional soccer player in Major League Soccer (MLS)

State championships

 Girls Basketball - 2011, 2012

Notes and references

External links
 

High schools in Summit County, Ohio
Educational institutions established in 1999
Public high schools in Ohio
1999 establishments in Ohio